John R. Hofstatter was a member of the Assembly during the 1911 session. Additionally, he was a Baraboo, Wisconsin alderman (similar to city councilman). He was a Democrat. Hofstatter was born in what is now Sumpter, Wisconsin in 1858.

References

People from Baraboo, Wisconsin
People from Sumpter, Wisconsin
Wisconsin city council members
1858 births
Year of death missing
Democratic Party members of the Wisconsin State Assembly